Colias thisoa is a butterfly in the family Pieridae. It is found in the mountains of the Caucasus, Transcaucasia, central Asia, southern Siberia, Turkey and Iran. The habitat consists of humid mountain meadows in the forest belt.

The larvae feed on Astragalus species.

Subspecies
The following subspecies are recognised:
Colias thisoa thisoa (Caucasus Major)
Colias thisoa strandiana Sheljuzhko, 1935 (Caucasus Minor, Armenian Highland)
Colias thisoa shakuhensis Sheljuzhko, 1935 (Talysh, Kopet-Dagh)
Colias thisoa aeolides Grum-Grshimailo, 1890 (northern and Inner Tian-Shan, Ghissar, Darvaz, Alai)
Colias thisoa urumtsiensis Verity, 1909 (central Tian-Shan)
Colias thisoa irtyschensis Lukhtanov, 1999 (south-western Altai)
Colias thisoa nikolaevi Korshunov, 1998 (Alai, Kurai, Tyurguno Steppe)

References

thisoa
Butterflies described in 1832
Butterflies of Asia